Pascal Groß (sometimes rendered in English as Gross; born 15 June 1991) is a German professional footballer who plays as a midfielder or defender for  club Brighton & Hove Albion. Groß played at youth international level for Germany.

Career

Early career
Groß played his first fully professional match in the Bundesliga for 1899 Hoffenheim on 2 May 2009 in a 0–4 loss against VfL Wolfsburg. being substituted on in the 89th minute for Chinedu Obasi. He scored his first senior career goal playing for Hoffenheim II playing against Stuttgarter Kickers II on 16 August 2009. In January 2011, he transferred to Karlsruher SC along with Hoffenheim teammate Marco Terrazzino.

Ingolstadt
In the summer of 2012, Groß joined FC Ingolstadt on a two-year deal. In the 2014–15 season, he played a vital role in the promotion of FC Ingolstadt to the Bundesliga as he scored 7 goals and assisted 23 goals.

Groß scored five league goals for FC Ingolstadt in the 2016–17 season as they were relegated from the Bundesliga. He created more chances than any other player in the league that season, a total of 95 chances.

Brighton & Hove Albion

2017–18 season
In May 2017, Brighton & Hove Albion signed Groß for a fee of £3 million.  He agreed to a four-year contract while the transfer fee paid to Ingolstadt was the first of a series of record signings for the club that season.

He made his debut for Brighton in the Premier League on 12 August 2017, in a 2–0 home defeat to title favourites Manchester City. On 9 September 2017, Groß made history by scoring Brighton's first ever Premier League goal, adding a second shortly after half time and providing an assist for Tomer Hemed in a 3–1 win at home against West Bromwich Albion. On 15 September, in Brighton's 2–1 league defeat away to AFC Bournemouth, Groß provided the assist for Solly March's opening goal.

Groß's creative exploits for Brighton throughout the month of September earned him a nomination for the Premier League Player of the Month award. He was a key player for Brighton, being directly involved in four of their league goals scored throughout the month.

On 15 October 2017, Groß provided his third assist of the season for Brighton, setting up Anthony Knockaert in a 1–1 league draw at home to Everton. On 20 November, Groß scored for Brighton in a 2–2 home draw against Stoke City. The goal brought his contribution tally up to three goals and five assists throughout the course of the season.

Groß ended a successful season for Brighton with seven goals and eight assists, including heading the winner against Manchester United on 4 May 2018, a win that secured Brighton's Premier League status. Amongst many highlights, Groß was voted Brighton's player of the season by an overwhelming majority.

On 6 June 2018, Groß signed a contract extension with Brighton, keeping him at the club until 2022.

2018–19 season
He scored against Man United again in another win over the side on 19 August 2018 in Brighton's first win of the 2018–19 season netting the Albion's third in an eventual 3–2 home victory. Groß scored three goals from 4 May 2018 to 19 January 2019 which all came up against Man United. His third coming in a 2–1 away loss at Old Trafford. He made one FA Cup appearance where he came off the bench in a 2–1 home win over Derby County with The Seagulls progressing into the quarter-finals. The Sussex club were eventually knocked out to Manchester City in the semi-final at Wembley. On 27 April 2019, he scored an equaliser at home against Newcastle, helping Brighton claim a point in their fight for survival. On 4 May 2019 Brighton's bitter rivals, Crystal Palace beat Cardiff City – Brighton's relegation rivals – which ensured Brighton's Premier League football for the next season.

2019–20 season
Groß played the whole match in Brighton's opening match of the 2019–20 season where The Seagulls won 3–0 at Watford. On 5 October, a Groß cross was spilt by Spurs' keeper, Hugo Lloris where Pascal's teammate, Neal Maupay nodded home the first in a 3–0 victory over the London side. Lloris dislocated his elbow after an awkward landing from the cross which would rule him out for the rest of 2019. Groß scored his first goal of the season netting the first in a eventual 3–2 home win over Everton on 26 October 2019.

2020–21 season

Groß made his 100th appearance for The Seagulls in which he captained the side in the 2–0 away win over Preston in the EFL Cup on 23 September 2020. He scored his first goal of the season on 28 November, scoring in the 93rd minute from the spot claiming Brighton's first ever Premier League points against the defending champions Liverpool. In the reverse fixture Groß appeared in Brighton's 1–0 away victory over the defending champions on 3 February 2021 claiming their first league win at Anfield since 1982. Groß captained Brighton on 18 May with Lewis Dunk out suspended in the match against champions Manchester City with fans returning to football. He assisted Adam Webster's header which equalised the score at 2–2 – from 2–0 down – in which Brighton went on to win 3–2 for their first victory over The Sky Blues since 1989.

2021–22 season

Groß set up Alexis Mac Allister's winner with a grounded pass into the box in the 2–1 away victory over Burnley on 14 August in the opening game of the 2021–22 season. He then assisted Shane Duffy's header from the corner spot in Brighton's 2–0 home victory over Watford on 21 August in the second game of the season. Groß had a penalty saved by Jack Butland in the home fixture against bitter rivals Crystal Palace on 14 January 2022, failing to put Brighton 1–0 up in an eventual 1–1 draw. On 7 May, he scored his first goal of the campaign, calmly steering in Brighton's third, in an eventual 4–0 victory over Manchester United earning Brighton their biggest ever top flight victory. Groß scored again two games later, his second and the last of the season on the final day of the campaign, putting Brighton ahead after they trailed at half time in the eventual 3–1 home victory over West Ham. He later assisted Albions''' third goal, a Danny Welbeck strike, who happened to set up Groß's goal. The victory meant they achieved their highest ever top flight finish, finishing ninth. On 3 June, it was announced that he had signed a new contract with The Albion, signing on until June 2024. Graham Potter was pleased by Groß's extension, commenting “I am delighted for Pascal and the club that he’s now signed," adding "He is an excellent professional on and off the pitch."

2022–23 season
On the opening game of the season Groß scored a brace against Manchester United in the 2–1 away win to claim The Seagulls first ever victory at Old Trafford. The goals also meant he scored three in two games against the Red Devils and four overall. Groß went on to score in Brighton's first home win of the season, as they beat Leeds United 1–0. Groß captained Brighton to a 5–1 away thrashing over Championship side Middlesbrough in the third round of the FA Cup on 7 January 2023. He scored the opening goal of the game, scoring his first ever FA Cup goal. Groß made his 200th appearance for Brighton on 15 March, as the Albion went on to beat their bitter rivals Crystal Palace 1–0 at Falmer Stadium.

Style of play

Groß can operate as a central midfielder, a winger, and an attacking midfielder.

Personal life
His father, Stephan, was also a footballer who played for Karlsruher SC.

Career statistics

HonoursFC Ingolstadt 042. Bundesliga:  2014–15Individual'''
Brighton & Hove Albion Player of the Year: 2017–18

References

External links

1991 births
Living people
Footballers from Mannheim
German footballers
Association football midfielders
Germany youth international footballers
TSG 1899 Hoffenheim II players
TSG 1899 Hoffenheim players
Karlsruher SC players
FC Ingolstadt 04 players
FC Ingolstadt 04 II players
Brighton & Hove Albion F.C. players
Bundesliga players
2. Bundesliga players
Premier League players
German expatriate footballers
German expatriate sportspeople in England
Expatriate footballers in England